The Weatherly Model 201 is a 1960s American agricultural monoplane designed and built by the Weatherly Aviation Company of Hollister, California.

Development
In the early 1960s, John Weatherly formed the Weatherly Aviation Company, to convert 19 Fairchild M-62s into the Weatherly WM-62C agricultural aircraft. With this experience, Weatherly designed his own agricultural monoplane, the Weatherly Model 201. The Weatherly 201 is a cantilever low-wing monoplane, with a fixed tailwheel landing gear, and powered by a nose-mounted 450 hp (336 kW) Pratt & Whitney R-985 radial engine. Its fuselage is constructed of steel tube with aluminium panel covering, while the wings, which are unswept and have 6 degrees of dihedral, are of all metal (aluminium) construction. It has an enclosed cockpit for the pilot, and a glassfibre 270 gallon (1022 litre) chemical hopper in the forward fuselage. It was designed for crop dusting and liquid spraying, and was certified in 1967.

In 1970, the Model 201A was introduced that had a larger chemical hopper and fuel capacity; it was also built as the Model 201B with minor improvements. In 1975, another improved version, the Model 201C, was introduced.

By 1979, more than 100 Model 201s had been built, and it was then succeeded by the improved Weatherly 620.

Variants
Model 201
Initial production variant, 2 built.
Model 201A
Enlarged fuel capacity and a larger chemical hopper, 5 built.
Model 201B
201A with a wider canopy, leading fillet at wing root and other minor improvements, 45 built.
Model 201C
Improved variant, 38 built.

Specifications (201A)

References

External links

 Type Certificate Data Sheet No. A10WE

1960s United States agricultural aircraft
201
Single-engined tractor aircraft
Low-wing aircraft
Aircraft first flown in 1967
Conventional landing gear